|}

The Garrowby Stakes is a Listed flat horse race in Great Britain open to horses aged three years or older. It is run at York over a distance of 6 furlongs (1,207 metres), and it is scheduled to take place each year in September.

The race was first run in 2012.  Until 2007, the name Garrowby (a hamlet in the East Riding of Yorkshire) was given to a valuable 12 furlongs handicap run at the same meeting.

Records
Most successful horse since 2012:
 no horse has won this race more than once

Leading jockey since 2012 (3 wins):
 Connor Beasley – Nameitwhatyoulike (2017), Dakota Gold (2019), Gale Force Maya (2022)

Leading trainer since 2012 (2 wins):
 Ed Walker -  Starman (2020), Great Ambassador (2021) 
 Michael Dods -  Dakota Gold (2019), Gale Force Maya (2022)

Winners since 2012

See also
 Horse racing in Great Britain
 List of British flat horse races

References
 Racing Post:
 

Flat races in Great Britain
York Racecourse
Open sprint category horse races
Recurring sporting events established in 2012
2012 establishments in England